The Museum of Theatrical Arts of Serbia is a museum located in Belgrade, the capital of Serbia. The museum also contains a library and a historical archive.

The library contains pieces of Scenography, along with historical pictures and paintings.

History
Museum was founded on 28 November 1950 under the decree of the Ministry for Science and Culture of Serbia. The idea of founding a Theatrical Arts museum began in 1901.

Božić's House
The Museum of Theatrical Arts of Serbia is placed in Božić's House, which was built in 1836, for Belgrade merchant Miloje Božić. In 1979, House was placed on Monument of Culture of Great Importance protection list, and it is protected by Republic of Serbia.

See also
 Monument of Culture of Great Importance
 Tourism in Serbia

External links
 

Museums in Belgrade
Museums established in 1950
1950 establishments in Serbia